Mesopotamia is an EP by American new wave band the B-52's, released in 1982. It was produced by David Byrne of Talking Heads and was originally planned to be the band's third studio album. Due to conflicts with Byrne and record label pressure, recording sessions were aborted prematurely and only six of ten songs to be completed were released. The record was distributed as a 12-inch EP by Warner Bros. in the U.S. and by Island Records on vinyl and cassette in the UK and other non-U.S. markets.

Mesopotamia is considered a departure in style for the B-52's, with Byrne and the band adding additional instruments, vocal overdubs, horns, synthesizers and layered percussion. A larger emphasis was placed on production after the raw sound of their 1979 eponymous debut album and the slightly more produced sound of their second album, Wild Planet (1980).

Background
Mesopotamia was initially conceived by the B-52's in October 1981, following the release of their previous album of remixes, Party Mix! The band's first two albums were largely made up of songs which they had been performing live for a number of years and, thus, Mesopotamia required new compositions. Drummer Keith Strickland later stated that living together in a house in upstate New York did not aid the writing process at this time. "The honeymoon was over. The fascination with being in a band, being successful – we'd already done it by that time. And at a level far beyond what we expected. We'd bought a house in Mahopac and were all living there together – and that created a strain on us, all living in one house together."

Additionally, guitarist Ricky Wilson stated in 1980 that the band felt constrained by outside expectations at this point in their career. Wilson observed that the band's manager, Gary Kurfirst, "was talking about our next album, and I mentioned that it might not be a dance record, and he was so shocked by that idea. It's shocking to me that people really do expect that of us now." Strickland later recalled that it was Kurfirst who was adamant that the band should change their sound, and that the decision was not arrived at "organically" by the band.

Kurfirst suggested that David Byrne of Talking Heads would be a good choice for the album's producer, due to his previous musical experience and history of touring with the B-52's. Despite time constraints with recording the soundtrack to The Catherine Wheel (1981), Byrne nevertheless agreed to produce Mesopotamia, producing the former during the day and the latter at night, with little sleep in between.

Production
Mesopotamia was a departure in style for the B-52's. For the EP, Byrne incorporated several elements from his work with Talking Heads, including horn sections, synthesizers and worldbeat influences.

Originally, Mesopotamia was conceived as a full album. Singer/instrumentalist Kate Pierson later stated that, while the band desired to write more songs for the project, manager Kurfirst demanded the band quickly put out more material and then suggested releasing a shorter EP as a compromise. Pierson stated that "'Cake' wasn't finished. 'Cake,' I just kind of stuck that lyric on in the studio in one take. It was just not finished. We sometimes think, 'Wow, if only we could go back and finish Mesopotamia." When the sessions initially broke down, Kurfirst arranged the release of a remix EP of old material, Party Mix!, while the band continued to work on the new sessions.

Pierson further stated that Island Records' Chris Blackwell did not want "Mesopotamia" included on the EP, despite the fact that it was the titular track and a completed piece: "I still think it's one of our best songs. And despite what Chris said, we never hesitated about putting it on there. We never thought, 'We're not putting this out.' We were always, like, 'Oh, yeah, we're putting 'Mesopotamia' on Mesopotamia."

Several tracks from the sessions were abandoned, and three were re-recorded for the following album, Whammy! (1983). There are four known outtakes:

"Queen of Las Vegas" – The original version of this song recorded for the intended full-length Mesopotamia album was released on the 2002 compilation album Nude on the Moon: The B-52's Anthology and features vocal performances from Pierson and Wilson, with Yogi Horton on drums. The song was modified and re-recorded in 1983 for the Whammy! album.
"Big Bird" – Re-recorded for Whammy!, this original version has never been released. However, "Big Bird" was included in the band's live set on the Mesopotamia tour and was largely the same as the version made available on the Whammy! album. It has since emerged that the band had wanted "Big Bird" to be on the EP instead of "Deep Sleep", but the record company disagreed and omitted "Big Bird" in favor of "Deep Sleep".
"Butterbean" – Re-recorded for Whammy!, this original version has never been released.
"Adios Desconocida" – A ballad with an uncharacteristically soft and romantic tone, this song was never remade by the band.

Mesopotamia was also unique for the band because many of the tracks did not feature the vocal interplay for which the band was known. The hiring of numerous session musicians was also a first for the B-52's, although this would be repeated on subsequent albums.

Release
Mesopotamia was released on January 27, 1982. In the UK, the EP was marketed as a mini-album, due to three songs—"Loveland, "Cake" and "Throw That Beat in the Garbage Can"—mistakenly appearing as rough extended remixes derived from demo tapes. When the band learned of this, the error was quickly rectified and the original mixes were reinstated. Later CD releases also reverted to the original mixes at the band's request. The EP was remixed by Tom Durack at Skyline Studios in July and August of 1990 and was packaged with Party Mix! as a single CD in 1991.

This was the last B-52's release where every track could be obtained on the A- and B-side of a single (as had happened with The B-52's and Wild Planet).

Reception

The EP charted in the Billboard 200 in the U.S. and the Top 20 in the UK Albums Chart. The title track garnered the band a following in the Detroit area, after an African-American radio station began playing the song. Vocalist Fred Schneider later credited Detroit DJ the Electrifying Mojo for making the song a crossover hit, but recalled that the B-52's were being actively discouraged from appealing to an African-American audience by Kurfirst, despite the band's love of soul music. Pierson later recalled getting into a verbal altercation with Kurfirst after he dissuaded them from accepting an invitation to appear on New York African-American radio station WBLS to promote the album, on the grounds that it would be "confusing" for their audience.

Robert Christgau of The Village Voice praised the EP, calling it "a 'party' record that never invokes that pooped word," and deeming Byrne "the secret ingredient". Conversely, Trouser Press felt the EP was where the band got "serious, with dire results", and while some tracks traded "élan for slickness", others appeared to be "selfconscious parodies of the old, carefree B-52's." 

In a retrospective review for AllMusic, William Ruhlmann felt the EP was a "lackluster set", calling it "the sound of a band that once sounded like it was on a steady path, now losing its footing."

Tour

In 1982, the B-52's returned to touring. Having been on the road for much of 1978, 1979 and 1980, the band had taken a break in 1981 and were struggling to create new material. With Mesopotamia, they had new material to showcase live. The dynamic of the live show changed slightly from previous tours. With the release of both Party Mix! and Mesopotamia, the band used the "Meso-America" tour to perform updated versions of some of the songs in their live set that they had been performing since 1977. Another change in 1982 was the keyboard setup, with Kate Pierson no longer standing behind a bass synth perched atop a Farfisa Compact Organ. To achieve the new sound of Party Mix! and Mesopotamia, she used a more sophisticated synthesizer, recreating the organ sounds of their debut, the synth sounds of Mesopotamia and simultaneously providing the undulating synth bass lines behind the band's signature new wave sound.

During the "Meso-America" tour, live versions of the songs were performed by: Cindy Wilson on guitar, bongos and vocals; Fred Schneider on vocals; Kate Pierson on keyboards, bass guitar and vocals; Ricky Wilson on guitars; and Keith Strickland on drums. Saxophones on tour were played by Ralph Carney and trumpet and duck calls were performed by David Buck.

Opening for over thirty dates on the 1982 Mesopotamia tour were the Bongos, who were supporting their debut album. A friendship was forged between the two bands which led to various collaborations, particularly between Fred Schneider and the Bongos' Richard Barone.

Track listing
Track times sourced via original Warner Bros. US and Island UK vinyl releases, as well as the 1991 remix CD.Side oneSide twoPersonnelThe B-52'sRicky Wilson – guitar, keyboard, bass guitar, organ
Cindy Wilson – vocals
Keith Strickland – keyboard, bass guitar, drums, organ, piano, marimba, guitar
Fred Schneider – vocals
Kate Pierson – vocals, keyboard, bass guitar, organ, bird callsAdditional musiciansDavid Byrne – fretless bass, synthesizer, guitar, percussion
Steve Scales – percussion
Yogi Horton – drums
Charles Rocket – accordion
Ralph Carney – saxophone
David Buck – trumpet
Roberto Arron – saxophoneTechnical'
David Byrne – producer
Butch Jones – engineer
Greg Calbi – mastering
Simon Levy – art direction, design
Desiree Rohr – illustration

Chart performance

Notes

References

1982 debut EPs
The B-52's EPs
Albums produced by David Byrne
Warner Records EPs
Island Records EPs
Songs about Iraq